Macrocoma bezdeki is a species of leaf beetle endemic to Socotra. It was described by Stefano Zoia in 2012. It is named after Jan Bezděk, a collector of the specimens studied and also a specialist in the leaf beetle subfamily Galerucinae.

References

bezdeki
Beetles of Asia
Beetles described in 2012
Endemic fauna of Socotra
Insects of the Arabian Peninsula